Queen Wonmok of the Icheon Seo clan (d. 16 June 1057) was the granddaughter of Seo Hui and the 6th wife of King Hyeonjong of Goryeo.

Biography

Ancestors and background

The future Queen Wonmok was born into the Icheon Seo clan as the daughter of Seo-Nul (서눌) and Lady Choe (부인 최씨). Her grandfather was a nobleman Seo Hui (서희) who was famous for his diplomatic skills when led 60,000 Khitan troops withdraw from Goryeo without a battle. She had a younger brother, Seo Su (서수, 徐琇) whom his descendants later held a noble position in the Goryeo Royal court.

Palace life
In 1022 (13rd year reign of Hyeonjong of Goryeo), she firstly entered the palace and honoured as Suk-Bi (숙비, 淑妃; "Pure Consort") and given a Royal title of Princess Heungseong (흥성궁주, 興盛宮主) while lived in "Heungseong Palace" (흥성궁, 興盛宮). In the same year, her father, Seo Nul held positions such as Jungchusahsangisangsi (중추사우산기상시, 中樞使右散騎常侍) and Seogyeongyusupansa (서경유수판사, 署經留守判事), also during King Deokjong's reign, Seo Nul became Munhasijung (문하시중, 門下侍中).

Then, in 1026, Hyeonjong gave her biological mother, Lady Choe a title of "Grand Lady of Icheon County" (이천군대부인, 利川郡大夫人) and her stepmother, Lady Jeong a title of "Grand Lady of Icheon County" (이천군대군, 利川郡大君).

Later life, Death and funeral
She outlived at least 26 years since her late husband's death in 1031 and later died on 16 June 1057 during the 11st year reign of her stepson, King Munjong. Although she was also one of the king's stepmother, but since she didn't have her own child, so many Ministers in the court told Munjong to not wear the "Sang-bok" (상복, 喪服; "mourning clothes") and he followed it as a result. For the same reason, her ancestral rites were not held on the New Year's Day.

Her body was cremated, but where her tomb's location is unknown since no records left about that. Under his command too, she was posthumously called as Queen Wonmok (원목왕후, 元穆王后).

References

External links
Queen Wonmok on Goryeosa .
Queen Wonmok on Encykorea .
원목왕후 on Doosan Encyclopedia .

10th-century births
Year of birth unknown
1057 deaths
Consorts of Hyeonjong of Goryeo
11th-century Korean women
Icheon Seo clan